Andrea Schjelderup Dalen (born 19 June 1992) is a Norwegian professional ice hockey forward and captain of Djurgårdens IF Hockey Dam in the Swedish Women's Hockey League (SDHL). She has been a member of the Norwegian national ice hockey team since 2008. Dalen currently holds the record for most goals in a single SDHL season, with 47 in the 2015–16 season, and is the seventh leading scoring all-time in SDHL history.

Playing career 
Dalen grew up playing on boys' teams in Ringerike in Norway and with Vålerenga Ishockey's women's side, before heading to Sweden to attend a hockey gymnasium and play for the SDHL's Linköping HC Dam in 2009. She led Linköping to a runner-up finish in the 2011 playoffs, while finishing as playoff scoring champion with seven points in four contests. In the regular season, she finished sixth in the scoring race. By the end of her two seasons in Linköping, she had scored 81 points in 54 games, including 50 goals.

Dalen joined the North Dakota women's ice hockey program in September 2011, joining fellow Norwegian goaltender Jorid Dagfinrud. Across 143 games with North Dakota, she scored 63 points, serving as the team's captain in her final season.

After graduating, Dalen returned to the SDHL to sign with Djurgårdens. In her first season back, she would score 73 points in 36 games, of which 47 were goals, an SDHL record. In her second season with Djurgården, the team would win the SDHL championship. In 2018, she was named the club's captain.

International 
Dalen represented her native Norway in the 2009 and 2011 Division I International Ice Hockey Federation (IIHF) World Championships. She registered four goals and one assist in 2009 IIHF Division I World Championship, helping Norway finish with the bronze medal. At the 2011 IIHF Division I World Championships, she tied for fourth in tournament scoring. Dalen played for Norway at the 2011 IIHF 12 Nations Tournament. She ranked second in Group C scoring with 6 points, behind teammate Helene Martinsen whose 8 points topped all Group C players.

Awards and honors
Norway's best player of the game against Germany, 2011 Division I International Ice Hockey Federation World Championships

Career stats

IIHF Division I

Swedish league

NCAA

References

External links 
 

1992 births
Living people
People from Ringerike (municipality)
Norwegian women's ice hockey players
Norwegian ice hockey forwards
Djurgårdens IF Hockey Dam players
North Dakota Fighting Hawks women's ice hockey players
Linköping HC Dam players
Norwegian expatriate ice hockey people
Norwegian expatriate sportspeople in Sweden
Norwegian expatriate sportspeople in the United States
Sportspeople from Viken (county)
Expatriate ice hockey players in Sweden
Expatriate ice hockey players in the United States